Sana Ay Ikaw Na Nga (International title: It Might Be You / ) is a Philippine television drama romance series broadcast by GMA Network. Directed by Gil Tejada Jr., it stars Tanya Garcia and Dingdong Dantes. It premiered on December 3, 2001 replacing Sa Dako Pa Roon. The series concluded on April 25, 2003 with a total of 361 episodes.

A remake aired in 2012.

Cast and characters

Lead cast
 Tanya Garcia as Cecilia Fulgencio-Altamonte / Margarita Zalameda
 Dingdong Dantes as Carlos Miguel Altamonte

Supporting cast
 Maricar de Mesa as Olga Villavicer / Vanessa Del Rio / Samantha Aguirre
 Eric Quizon as Gilbert Zalameda
 Nancy Castiglione as Patrice Saavedra
 Angelu de Leon as Agnes Consuelo Villavicer
 Bobby Andrews as Vladimir Gaston
 Antoinette Taus as Rosemarie Madrigal
 Joey De Leon as Ricardo Peron
 Tirso Cruz III as Juancho Fulgencio
 Jaclyn Jose as Mariana Madrigal-Fulgencio / Mariana Madrigal-Peron
 Elizabeth Oropesa as Victoria Altamonte
 Chinggoy Alonzo as Ramon Altamonte
 Wendell Ramos as Jose Enrique Altamonte
 Roxanne Barcelo as Eloisa Fulgencio
 Kevin Vernal as Apollo
 Meryll Soriano as Esme

Recurring cast
 King Alcala as Jimboy Villavicer
 Monina Bagatsing as Alyssa
 Aleck Bovick as Yvonne
 Robin Da Rosa as JC Fulgencio
 Dexter Doria as Rebecca
 Ryan Eigenmann as Leroy Zalameda
 Cheska Garcia as Charity Gaston
 Vanna Garcia as Frances Peron
 Mel Kimura as Anna
 Maureen Larrazabal as Pandora
 Lala Montelibano as Ambrosia
 Tita Muñoz as Doña 
 Miles Poblete as Ponyang
 Tiya Pusit as Ising
 Biboy Ramirez as Guiller
 Dennis Roldan as Amadeus
 Red Sternberg as Raul Gaston
 Marita Zobel as Mona

Guest cast
 Marianne dela Riva
 Roy Alvarez
 Bernadette Allyson
 Kier Legaspi
 L.A. Mumar
 Julia Montes as Danica 
 Jaime Fabregas
 Isko Moreno
 Ilonah Jean
 Jet Alcantara
 Via Veloso
 Lara Fabregas
 Wendy Fernado
 Tessie Villarama
 Pia Pilapil
 Gabby Eigenmann
 Marcus Madrigal
 Dino Guevara
 Kristopher Peralta
 Raquel Montesa
 Tricia Roman
 Leandro Valdemor
 Odette Khan
 Yraz Melchor
 Eagle Riggs
 Rachel Tan-Carrasco

References

External links

2001 Philippine television series debuts
2003 Philippine television series endings
Filipino-language television shows
GMA Network drama series
Philippine romance television series
Television shows set in the Philippines